Harry Beasley may refer to:

Harry Geoffrey Beasley (1881–1939), British anthropologist
Harry C. Beasley (1888–1931), United States Navy seaman 
Harry Beasley (athlete) (1892–1972), Canadian Olympic sprinter
Harry Beasley (footballer) (1919–1979), Australian rules footballer